Tryphon is a 1668 tragedy by the Irish writer Roger Boyle, 1st Earl of Orrery. It was originally staged by the Duke's Company at the Lincoln's Inn Fields Theatre in London. The original cast is unknown.

References

Bibliography
 Keenan, Tim. Restoration Staging, 1660-74. Taylor & Francis, 2016.
 Maguire, Nancy Klein. Regicide and Restoration: English Tragicomedy, 1660-1671. Cambridge University Press, 1992.
 Van Lennep, W. The London Stage, 1660-1800: Volume One, 1660-1700. Southern Illinois University Press, 1960.

1668 plays
English plays
Irish plays
West End plays
Tragedy plays
Historical plays